KGMT (1310 AM) is a radio station  broadcasting an Oldies format. It is licensed to Fairbury, Nebraska, United States.  The station is currently owned by Flood Communications of Beatrice, LLC.

The station derives a portion of its programming from Scott Shannon's The True Oldies Channel from ABC Radio.

References

External links

GMT
Oldies radio stations in the United States